Butter Valley Golf Port  is a golf course with a privately owned, public-use airport located on the Butter Valley Golf Port golf course, located one nautical mile (1.85 km) east of the borough of Bally in Montgomery County, Pennsylvania, United States.

Facilities and aircraft 

For the 12-month period ending April 16, 2010, the airport had 3,500 general aviation aircraft operations, an average of 10 per day. There are 16 aircraft based at this airport: 94% single-engine and 6% multi-engine.

References

External links

Airports in Pennsylvania
Transportation buildings and structures in Montgomery County, Pennsylvania